Dhianpur is a village in Gurdaspur district in the Indian state of Punjab. Located about 20 km from Batala city, it is also known for the ashram of Baba Lal Dayal, a fourteenth century Hindu religious saint of the Punjab. The 2001 census of India recorded Dhianpur as having a population of 3,095 forming 510 households.

References

Villages in Gurdaspur district